Soratja Chansrisukot (born 16 February 1985) is a women's singles badminton player from Thailand. In 2006, she competed at the Doha Asian Games. She was one of the national team's top notch, ranked 45. Her best performance was still at satellite-ranked tournaments, when she won the women's singles title at the 2004 India Satellite tournament.

Achievements

Southeast Asian Games 
Women's singles

Asian Junior Championships 
Girls' doubles

BWF International Series/Asian Satellite
Women's singles

Women's doubles

References

External links 
 

Living people
1985 births
Soratja Chansrisukot
Badminton players at the 2006 Asian Games
Soratja Chansrisukot
Competitors at the 2003 Southeast Asian Games
Competitors at the 2005 Southeast Asian Games
Competitors at the 2007 Southeast Asian Games
Soratja Chansrisukot
Soratja Chansrisukot
Soratja Chansrisukot
Southeast Asian Games medalists in badminton
Universiade gold medalists for Thailand
Universiade medalists in badminton
Medalists at the 2007 Summer Universiade
Soratja Chansrisukot